Randall T. Pettigrew is an American politician, businessman, and engineer serving as a member of the New Mexico House of Representatives from the 61st district. Elected in 2020, he assumed office on January 19, 2021.

Education 
Pettigrew earned a Bachelor of Science degree in civil engineering from New Mexico State University.

Career 
For 20 years, he worked as a corporate executive before founding his own construction and engineering company, Pettigrew & Associates. In 2020, Pettigrew declared his candidacy for district 61 in the New Mexico House of Representatives after incumbent Republican David Gallegos decided to run for the New Mexico Senate. Pettigrew was unopposed in the November general election. He assumed office on January 19, 2021.

Personal life 
Pettigrew is married to Shannon Pettigrew, a businesswoman. They have three children. Pettigrew lives in Lovington, New Mexico.

References 

Living people
Businesspeople from New Mexico
Engineers from New Mexico
New Mexico State University alumni
Republican Party members of the New Mexico House of Representatives
People from Lovington, New Mexico
Year of birth missing (living people)